Sotiris Angelopoulos (26 September 1937 – 14 August 1997) was a Greek footballer. He played in eight matches for the Greece national football team from 1957 to 1960.

References

External links
 
 

1937 births
1997 deaths
Greek footballers
Greece international footballers
Place of birth missing
Association football defenders
People from Xylokastro
Panathinaikos F.C. players